The Parker E-ACT Academy (formerly William Parker School) is an 11–18 secondary school with academy status situated in Daventry, Northamptonshire, England. The school is sponsored by E-ACT, and there are approximately 1500 students on the campus which is also shared with Falconer's Hill Infant and Junior Schools.

References

External links
 Official website

Secondary schools in West Northamptonshire District
Academies in West Northamptonshire District
E-ACT
Daventry
Educational institutions with year of establishment missing